The Cashaqua Shale is a geologic formation in New York. It preserves fossils dating back to the Devonian period.

The Cashaqua shale underlies the Rhinestreet Shale member of the West Falls Group, and overlies various other members of the Sonyea Group. In the western part of New York State, it overlies the Middlesex Shale, and moving eastward, it overlies the Pulteney shale and then the Rock Stream Formation in west-central New York.

See also

 List of fossiliferous stratigraphic units in New York

References

 
 
 
 
 
 

Devonian geology of New York (state)